Helmdon railway station served the village and civil parish of Helmdon in Northamptonshire on the former Great Central Main Line (GCR). It was the second of two stations in the parish, the first being  on the Stratford-upon-Avon and Midland Junction Railway.

History

The GCR main line was the last main line to be built from northern England to London. It opened for passenger services on 15 March 1899 and for goods services in April. The station, originally named "Helmdon", opened with the line on 15 March 1899.

From the station the line ran northwards on an embankment before crossing the valley on the nine-arch Helmdon Viaduct over the River Tove.

Helmdon was the nearest station for Sulgrave Manor, which had been the home of George Washington's ancestors in the 16th and 17th centuries. In the 1920s the house was restored and opened as a museum, and due to this connection the LNER renamed Helmdon station "Helmdon for Sulgrave" in 1928.

British Railways closed the station to passengers on 4 March 1963 and to goods on 2 November 1964. In 1966 BR closed the line and the station was demolished. The platforms remain albeit largely hidden in the undergrowth. The viaduct remains.

Route

See also
The Reshaping of British Railways

Notes

References

External links
Helmdon Station on navigable 1946 O.S. map

Disused railway stations in Northamptonshire
Former Great Central Railway stations
Railway stations in Great Britain opened in 1899
Railway stations in Great Britain closed in 1963
West Northamptonshire District